The Phage 21 S (P21 Holin) Family (TC# 1.E.1) is a member of the Holin Superfamily II.

The Bacteriophage P21 Lysis protein S holin (TC# 1.E.1.1.1) is the prototype for class II holins. Lysis S proteins have two transmembrane segments (TMSs), with both the N- and C-termini on the cytoplasmic side of the inner membrane. TMS1 may be dispensable for function.

A homologue of the P21 holin is the holin of bacteriophage H-19B (TC# 1.E.1.1.3). The gene encoding it has been associated with the Shiga-like Toxin I gene in E. coli. It may function in toxin export as has been proposed for the X. nematophila holin-1 (TC #1.E.2.1.4).

A representative list of proteins belonging to the P21 holin family can be found in the Transporter Classification Database.

See also 
 Holin
 Lysin
 Transporter Classification Database

Further reading 
 Gaeng, Susanne; Scherer, Siegfried; Neve, Horst; Loessner, Martin J. (2000-07-01). "Gene Cloning and Expression and Secretion of Listeria monocytogenes Bacteriophage-Lytic Enzymes in Lactococcus lactis".Applied and Environmental Microbiology 66 (7): 2951–2958. ISSN 0099-2240. PMC 92096. PMID 10877791.
 Lacal, J C; Santos, E; Notario, V; Barbacid, M; Yamazaki, S; Kung, H; Seamans, C; McAndrew, S; Crowl, R (1984-09-01). "Expression of normal and transforming H-ras genes in Escherichia coli and purification of their encoded p21 proteins.". Proceedings of the National Academy of Sciences of the United States of America 81(17): 5305–5309. ISSN 0027-8424. PMC 391692.PMID 6089191.
 Pang, Ting; Savva, Christos G.; Fleming, Karen G.; Struck, Douglas K.; Young, Ry (2009-11-10)."Structure of the lethal phage pinhole". Proceedings of the National Academy of Sciences of the United States of America 106 (45): 18966–18971.doi:10.1073/pnas.0907941106. ISSN 1091-6490.PMC 2776468. PMID 19861547.
 Park, Taehyun; Struck, Douglas K.; Dankenbring, Chelsey A.; Young, Ry (2007-12-01). "The pinholin of lambdoid phage 21: control of lysis by membrane depolarization". Journal of Bacteriology 189(24): 9135–9139. doi:10.1128/JB.00847-07. ISSN 1098-5530. PMC 2168629. PMID 17827300.
 Srividhya, K. V.; Krishnaswamy, S. (2007-08-01). "Subclassification and targeted characterization of prophage-encoded two-component cell lysis cassette".Journal of Biosciences 32 (5): 979–990. ISSN 0250-5991.PMID 17914239.

References 

Holins
Protein families